The Kia Sonet is a subcompact crossover SUV manufactured by Kia since 2020. Developed mainly for the Indian market, the Sonet is positioned below the Seltos and is closely related to the similarly-sized sibling Hyundai Venue. It is marketed in emerging markets including India, Nepal, Indonesia, South Africa, Vietnam, Middle East, and several Latin American countries.

Overview 
The Sonet was previewed as the Sonet Concept in February 2020. The production version made its global debut on 7 August 2020 and was sold starting from 18 September 2020 in India. It is the third model from Kia in India after the Seltos and the Carnival.

In the Indian market, the Sonet occupies the sub-4-metre SUV category with its  length dimension, benefitting from the Indian tax benefits for cars shorter than 4 meters.

Kia claimed that the Sonet uses high strength steel structure that helps in reducing the impact of severe accidents. Some of its safety features for its top trims include six airbags, electronic stability control, anti-lock braking system, hill start assistance control, vehicle stability management system, speed alert system, electronic traction control, parking sensors, braking assistance and driver’s seat belts given with pre-tensioners.

A version of the Sonet with three-row seating was introduced in Indonesia in April 2021. Marketed as the "Sonet 7", the third row bench seat is installed without any exterior bodywork changes, meaning with the third row seat up, the boot space is effectively eliminated. The Sonet 7 is also equipped with a roof-mounted air circulator system, and a revised second row bench seat with split folding and a one-touch folding mechanism which allows access to the third row. It was discontinued in 2022.

In September 2022, a new sub-model named X-Line was introduced in India. The new X-Line consist only of cosmetic changes rather than mechanical changes. The trim is available in two engine options, 1.0-litre turbo petrol engine and the 1.5-litre CRDi diesel.

Engines

Sales

References

External links 

 Official website (India)

Cars introduced in 2020
Crossover sport utility vehicles
Front-wheel-drive vehicles
Sonet
Mini sport utility vehicles
Sonet
Vehicles with CVT transmission